Gorje is a settlement in the hills north of Cerkno in the traditional Littoral region of Slovenia.

References

External links

Gorje on Geopedia

Populated places in the Municipality of Cerkno